City Without Men is a 1943 American film noir crime film directed by Sidney Salkow and starring Linda Darnell, Edgar Buchanan and Michael Duane. It was released by Columbia Pictures on January 14, 1943. A group of women lives in a boarding house near a prison where the residents are the wives of the prison inmates.

Plot
The film opens with the prologue: July 1941—five months before Pearl Harbor, but already the coming events were casting their shadows before.

At sea, Tom Adams order two Japanese men into his speedboat after seeing them climbing into a rowboat from an English ship. When Tom is approached by the Coast Guard they refuse to believe his story and charge him with aiding and abetting the Japanese. Tom is found guilty and sentenced to five years in prison. Nancy Johnson (Linda Darnell) Tom's girlfriend is determined to exonerate him. Outside the prison, Nancy meets Michael Malloy (Edgar Buchanan) and learns that his brother is the head of the parole board. She asks Michael to present Tom's case to his brother. Nancy gets a job at the local laundry, and rents a room in Maria Barton's (Sara Allgood) boarding house, whose tenants are the wives of the prison inmates. She meets other tenants, Gwen (Leslie Brooks) Winnie and Billie LaRue (Glenda Farrell).

On visiting day, Tom who has become embittered and disillusioned by his imprisonment refuses to see Nancy. When Tom learns about the bombing of Pearl Harbor, he asks for a chance to defend his country and petitions to be paroled into military service. Other prisoners also join Tom on the petition. However, the petition is denied by the parole board. Meanwhile, Winnie has secured a blueprint of the prison and plans to hide the convicts in bales, which would then be loaded onto a boat for delivery. The wives decide to conceal their plans from Nancy and scheduled the prison break for Friday night. On Friday morning, Maria is told that her husband, who is also in prison is at the hospital. She rushes to the hospital and learns that he was stabbed for threatening to inform the prison warden about a prison break. Her husband asks Maria to warn the warden.

Meanwhile, Nancy sees a newspaper headline which substantiates Tom's story. She goes to Michael and shows him the headline and asks him to fight for Tom's freedom. Michael barges into his brother's office and makes an impassioned speech about the injustice that was done to Tom. Michael's brother agreed to phone the warden on Tom's behalf. When the wives who are waiting at the shore for their husband hears the prison sirens, they realize that the prison escape has failed. Later, after Tom is freed from prison he reconciles with Nancy.

Cast

Production
Samuel Goldwyn Productions acquired the rights to the story by Albert Bein and Aben Kandel in 1939. Actor Jon Hall was originally set to star as the male lead and Jean Arthur was considered as his female co-star in the film. In 1942, Samuel Goldwyn Productions sold the rights to Columbia Pictures for $43,000. Columbia Pictures negotiated with actors Alan Marshal and Phillip Terry to play the male lead in the movie. Glenda Farrell replaced Claire Trevor who was initially cast to play Billie LaRue. Actresses Sara Allgood and Linda Darnell were borrowed from 20th Century Fox for the film. The waterfront scenes in the movie were filmed in San Pedro, California.

Home media
Columbia Pictures released the film on DVD on August 31, 2004.

References

External links
City Without Men at Internet Movie Database

1943 films
Films directed by Sidney Salkow
Columbia Pictures films
1943 crime drama films
American crime drama films
American black-and-white films
1940s prison films
1940s American films